Al-Sheikh or Al-Shaykh may refer to:

Al ash-Sheikh, Saudi clan
Al-Sheikh (surname)
Wadi al-Sheikh
Tell al-Sheikh
Dayr al-Shaykh